San Pedro de Colalao is a settlement in Tucumán Province in northern Argentina.

History

Location

Economy

Tourism

La Piedra Pintada 

La piedra pintada (the painted rock) as it is called, is one of the most important and valuable archaeological relics in San Pedro de Colalao. This rock with numerous pictograph carvings was discovered in 1877 by professor Inocencio Liberan. The meanings of the carvings are unknown but are believed to be related to fertility and crops. Birds and other animals can also be identified. Piedra pintada is about an hour and a half walk from town, surrounded by much lush vegetation and near the banks of the river Tipa Mayo.

Gruta de Lordes 

Our Lady of Lourdes is the second patron saint of San Pedro de Colalao, and enjoys great devotion from the community. This site is a replica of the Our Lady of Lourdes grotto in France. In February, thousands of devotees gather to witness the work of the Miracle of Our Lady of Lourdes, represented by professional actors and local partners.

Iglesia de San Pedro 

The church of San Pedro de Colalao is located at the southern edge of Leocadio Paz Square in the center of town. The construction of the church was started in 1895 by the Medici brothers, who were natives of Modena. Inside the church, there is a canvas depicting the Immaculate Conception, by the Italian Gaspar Spadafora. There are other artifacts of religious value, some over 300 years old.

Reserva Fitozoológica 

San Pedro de Colalao is home to the Dr. Carlos Pellegrini Zoological Reserve. The reserve is 400 ha and was inaugurated in 1994, and currently has over 150 different animal species. Hours of operation are from 9:00 am – 7:00 pm, every day.

 

Populated places in Tucumán Province